Hakelocaris vavassorii is an extinct species of prawn belonging to the family Penaeidae. It was named in 1994 by Alessandro Garassino, and is the only species in the genus Hakelocaris.

These prawns lived during the Cenomanian age. Fossils have been found in fossiliferous marine outcrops in Hjoula and Mayfouq Lebanon.

References

Penaeidae
Late Cretaceous crustaceans
Monotypic arthropod genera
Cenomanian genera
Fossils of Lebanon
Fossil taxa described in 1994
Cretaceous Lebanon
Late Cretaceous arthropods of Asia